Jones Joubert (born February 17, 1989) is a Seychelles football player who plays for Cote d'Or FC. He is a defender playing for the Seychelles national football team.

References 

1989 births
Living people
Seychellois footballers
Saint Louis Suns United FC players
The Lions FC players
Cote d'Or FC players
Seychelles international footballers
Association football defenders